Sanatan Dinda (born 5 February 1971) is an Indian visual artist from Kolkata India. He grew in stature to be the first Indian artist having a displayed portrait of Mother Teresa at the Buckingham Palace (a commissioned work).

Early life and education

Dinda born in Kumartuli intestines of North Kolkata, he graduated fine arts (Western painting) from the Government College of Art & Craft, Kolkata in 1992.

Sanatan Dinda contributes to the Durga puja of his locality and in doing so has picked up various awards. His artwork is private collections of  former cricketer Sachin Tendulkar Amjad Ali Khan, RPG Enterprises, Reliance Industries, Ballarpur Industries Limited, etc. His exhibition at the Hyatt Regency hotel in Kolkata on 28–29 January 2010 was inaugurated by Amjad Ali Khan.

References

 
 

Indian portrait painters
Government College of Art & Craft alumni
University of Calcutta alumni
Living people
1971 births
Artists from Kolkata
Indian male painters